General Antonio Elizalde Canton or Bucay Canton is a canton of Ecuador, located in the Guayas Province.  Its capital is the town of General Antonio Elizalde or Bucay.  Its population at the 2001 census was 8,696.

Demographics
Ethnic groups as of the Ecuadorian census of 2010:
Mestizo  83.0%
White  6.8%
Afro-Ecuadorian  4.9%
Montubio  3.2%
Indigenous  1.8%
Other  0.3%

References

Cantons of Guayas Province